Amy Hughes can refer to:
Amy Hughes (runner), British marathon runner
Amy Hughes (artist), British contemporary artist
Amy Hughes (administrator), British nursing administrator
 Amy Hughes, woman shot by police in Tucson, Arizona, leading to US Supreme Court case Kisela v. Hughes